Prairie Fever is a 2008 American Western direct-to-video film directed by Stephen Bridgewater. It stars Kevin Sorbo, Lance Henriksen and Dominique Swain.

Plot summary

Preston Biggs (Kevin Sorbo) a former sheriff of Clearwater, escorts three women suffering from prairie fever to Carson City. Lettie (Jillian Armenante) tried to kill her husband, Abigale (Dominique Swain) too fragile for prairie life, and Bible-quoting Blue (Felicia Day) just snapped on her farm, with the help of a gambler named Olivia (Jamie Anne Allman).

Cast
 Kevin Sorbo as Sheriff Preston Biggs
 Lance Henriksen as Monte James
 Dominique Swain as Abigail
 Jamie Anne Allman as Olivia Thibodeaux
 Jillian Armenante as Lettie
 Felicia Day as Blue
 Lucy Lee Flippin as Faith
 Robert Norsworthy as Bartender
 Blake Gibbons as Charlie
 Don Swayze as James
 Richard Clarke Larsen as Carson City Hotel Clerk
 Silas Weir Mitchell as Frank
 Ken Magee as Homer
 Chris McKenna as Sheriff Logan
 E.E. Bell as Luke

References

External links 
 
 
 

2008 films
2008 direct-to-video films
American direct-to-video films
Direct-to-video Western (genre) films
2000s feminist films
2000s road movies
American chase films
American road movies
2000s English-language films
Films about friendship
Films about rape
Films directed by David S. Cass Sr.
Girls with guns films
Films directed by Stephen Bridgewater
2000s American films